This is an alphabetical list of heliports in Canada. It includes all Nav Canada certified and registered heliports in the provinces and territories of Canada.

They are listed in the format:

 Airport name as listed in the Canada Flight Supplement (CFS), ICAO code, community served, and province and coordinates.

The airport name in the CFS may differ from the name used by the airport authority.

References

 
Heliports
Canada